Chalakkadavu is a village in Kasaragod district of Kerala state, India.it is located in madikai Panchayath.

Location
Chalakkadavu is located in Madikai gram panchayat of Kasaragod district. Kerala India Chalakkadavu bus stop is also called "Unniam Velicham Bus Stop".

Landmarks
An Ayurveda hospital, a village office, and a palliative care center are located in Chalakkadavu.

Transportation
Local roads have access to NH.66 which connects to Mangalore in the north and Calicut in the south. The nearest railway station is Nileshwar on Mangalore-Palakkad line. There are airports at Mangalore and Calicut.

References

Nileshwaram area